Paul William Dodge (born 26 February 1958 in Leicester, England) is a former English rugby union international footballer who gained 32 caps for his country between 1978 and 1985. His Leicester Tigers career earned him 436 appearances.

Dodge started playing for his local club, Syston RFC, from where he progressed to join Tigers as a youth player and as a 17-year-old, made his first team debut in the annual Christmas fixture against the Barbarians. His  debut came two years later.  With Clive Woodward he formed a centre partnership that played for Tigers, England and the British Lions tour to South Africa in 1980.  In 1985 he captained England eight times and captained Tigers in the 1987/88 season.  After retiring he became Leicester backs coach between 1993 and 1996 before becoming an academy coach in 1998.

External links
Sporting Heroes part 1
Sporting Heroes part 2
Sporting Heroes part 3
Sunday Times article 15 November 2009

1958 births
Living people
English rugby union players
England international rugby union players
Rugby union centres
Leicester Tigers players
Leicester Tigers coaches
British & Irish Lions rugby union players from England
Rugby union players from Leicester